Olearia plucheacea is a species of flowering plant in the family Asteraceae and is endemic to inland Western Australia. It is an erect, open shrub with scattered hairy, thread-like to linear leaves, and white and yellow daisy-like inflorescences.

Description

Taxonomy
Olearia plucheacea was first formally described in 1990 by Nicholas Sèan Lander in the journal Nuytsia. The specific epithet (plucheacea) means "resembling Pluchea".

Distribution and habitat
This daisy bush grows on stony soil in woodland or shrubland in the Carnarvon, Gascoyne, Murchison and Pilbara bioregions of inland Western Australia.

Conservation status
Olearia plucheacea is listed as "not threatened" by the Western Australian Government Department of Biodiversity, Conservation and Attractions.

References

plucheacea
Flora of Western Australia
Plants described in 1990